Sepsina alberti, also known commonly as Albert's skink and Albert's burrowing skink, is a species of lizard in the family Scincidae. The species is endemic to Namibia.

Etymology
Unfortunately, Hewitt did not explain to whom the specific name, alberti, refers.  It may be in honor of Albert I of Belgium, or Belgian-British herpetologist George Albert Boulenger, or an altogether different Albert.

Habitat

Description
The legs are short, but well developed, with four toes on each foot, and with a claw on each toe.

Reproduction
S. alberti is viviparous.

References

Further reading
Hewitt H (1929). "On some Scincidae from South Africa, Madagascar and Ceylon". Annals of the Transvaal Museum 13 (1): 1–8. (Sepsina alberti, p. 4).

alberti
Reptiles of Namibia
Reptiles described in 1929
Taxa named by John Hewitt (herpetologist)